Vallan Kumaran Vilai is a village in Kanyakumari district, Tamil Nadu, India. It is situated about two kilometers from Nagercoil.

Climate
The maximum temperature during the summer hovers around 100 °F or 34 °C with moderate humidity at times. Kanyakumari district is the only Indian district to receive both the north-east monsoon and the south-west monsoon. It rains more often in Kanyakumari district than in any other part of Tamil Nadu, with the exception of the Nilgiris. Due to geographical conditions, the southern tip of Kanyakumari is generally 3 °C to 4 °C hotter than Nagercoil during the daytime, though Kanyakumari is only 20 km away.

Schools in Vallankumaranvilai
 Govt. Higher Secondary School
 Govt. Primary School
 Vivekananda Kendra 
 Kumaran Nursery School

Places of worship
 Sri Vanna Ganeshar Temple
 Devi Sri Mutharamman Temple
 Sri Kannan Temple
 Sri Siva Sudalai Andavar Temple

Villages in Kanyakumari district